Laurel Canyon is a mountainous neighborhood in the Hollywood Hills region of the Santa Monica Mountains, within the Hollywood Hills West district of Los Angeles, California.  The main thoroughfare of Laurel Canyon Boulevard connects the neighborhood with the more urbanized parts of Los Angeles to the north and south, between Ventura Boulevard and Hollywood Boulevard.

Originally inhabited by the Tongva people, by the early 20th century real estate developers situated a vacation site along the slope of neighboring Lookout Mountain; this formed the nucleus of what would become the Laurel Canyon neighborhood. It later developed into a celebrity enclave: the remote, rugged nature of the land and its proximity to many of the movie studios in nearby Hollywood made it an ideal location for many movie stars to site their homes, especially during the Golden Age of Hollywood. Raymond Chandler's private detective Philip Marlowe in The Long Good-bye lives in Laurel Canyon, Yucca Avenue in the early 1950's.

By the 1960s, the neighborhood had become a local center for counterculture, and many prominent folk and rock musicians moved into the area, making it a nexus for musical collaboration. By the late 1970s, criminal activity in the neighborhood, including distribution of drugs, was controlled by the Wonderland Gang (named for a Laurel Canyon thoroughfare), and the neighborhood became associated with the Wonderland murders, a grisly quadruple homicide in 1981.

Location
Laurel Canyon is focused on its central thoroughfare, Laurel Canyon Boulevard. However, unlike other nearby canyon neighborhoods, Laurel Canyon has houses lining one side of the main street most of the way up to Mulholland Drive. There are many side roads that branch off the main canyon, but most are not through streets, reinforcing the self-contained nature of the neighborhood. Some of the main side streets are Mount Olympus, Kirkwood, Wonderland Avenue, Willow Glen, and Lookout Mountain Avenue. The zip code for a portion of the neighborhood is 90046.

Laurel Canyon Boulevard is an important North–South route between: West Hollywood, Hollywood, and Central Los Angeles; and Studio City and the eastern San Fernando Valley. The canyon's division between the two regions is defined by Mulholland Drive.

The Laurel Canyon neighborhood is generally bounded by West Hollywood to the west and south, Hollywood to the east, and Studio City to the north.

History

Tongva indigenous peoples
The Laurel Canyon area was inhabited by the Tongva people, a regional tribe of the indigenous peoples of California, for thousands of years. A spring-fed stream flowed year-round providing water.

The reliable water supply attracted colonial Spanish ranchers who started grazing sheep on the hillsides in the late 18th and early 19th centuries. After the Mexican–American War and the advent of U.S. statehood for California in 1850, the area was settled by Americans interested in water rights.

Lookout Mountain
Until the twentieth century, passage up the canyon was made on foot or by mule. In 1907, an 82-mile dirt road, later named Laurel Canyon Boulevard, was built. It ran up the canyon, dividing at what is now Lookout Mountain Road; the left road went up to the summit of Lookout Mountain, and the right branch of the road went to the top of the Santa Monica Mountains and then down to the San Fernando Valley.

In 1908, the Lookout Mountain Park and Water Co. was formed to purchase 280 acres on Lookout Mountain, just west of Laurel Canyon, subdivided and marketed as mountain vacation properties. On August 14, 1908, the Los Angeles Times announced that the company would build Lookout Mountain Inn at the summit of Lookout Mountain and Sunset Plaza roads, and Lookout Mountain Park, Bungalow Land at Laurel Canyon Boulevard and Lookout Mountain Avenue and Wonderland Park. Two years later, the company widened the winding dirt road to the top of Lookout Mountain where they built the Lookout Mountain Inn.

In 1910, Charles Mann, a real estate developer and Richard Shoemaker, an electrical engineer, built a "trackless trolley" (trolley bus) line which ran between the Laurel Canyon Pacific Electric Shuttle stop at the foot of Laurel Canyon at Sunset Boulevard. Passenger service began on September 11, 1915, on what was the first commercial trolley bus operation in the United States. The Laurel Canyon Pacific Electric Shuttle ran from the foot of Laurel Canyon at Sunset Boulevard to Gardner Junction at Gardner Street and Sunset Boulevard, Beverly Hills line of the Pacific Electric Railway station (1451 N Gardner St, West Hollywood, CA 90046), up Laurel Canyon Road from Sunset Boulevard to the Tavern at the base of Lookout Mountain Road, a road house serving visitors.

 
Each of the two 16-passenger cars had two trolley poles, one to a positive overhead wire and one to a ground overhead wire, and were able to sway to either side of the street, only using power uphill. Each trolley was actually an Oldsmobile bus whose gasoline engine was replaced with a 15-horsepower electric motor. Their original bodies were rebuilt in 1912, their open sides being enclosed. The service ended sometime in 1915 and was replaced by Stanley steam buses, the overhead wires taken down. Until 1918, the shuttle service traveled up and down Laurel Canyon to meet the half hour schedule to Los Angeles. It was insufficiently patronized and discontinued when Pacific Electric stopped running streetcars between Gardner Junction and Laurel Canyon Boulevard, and demand failed to support it.

On October 26, 1918, a fire, fanned by strong Santa Ana winds, burned about 200 acres and totally destroyed Lookout Mountain Inn at the summit of Lookout Mountain Avenue and Sunset Plaza Drive. Another major fire occurred in July 1959, destroying some 38 homes.

As the roads were improved, access was possible by automobile.

As of 2007 a vacant lot, the corner of Lookout Mountain Avenue and Laurel Canyon Blvd (2401 Laurel Canyon Blvd) is where the Tavern, a famous 1915 "Log Cabin" mansion stood, with its 80-foot living room, floor to ceiling fireplace, bowling alley and indoor sunken swimming pool. It was once occupied by silent film star Tom Mix but spent years on the rental market. In 1968 it was rented by Frank Zappa who turned it into a recording studio and celebrity hangout. However, Zappa moved out after six months. The house burned to the ground on Halloween 1981.

Directly across the street, at 2400 Laurel Canyon Blvd., is site of the home, long-gone, that magician Harry Houdini may have rented around 1919. It was originally the Walker estate.

Laurel Canyon is known for its natural wildlife and is home to at least one adult male mountain lion.

Counterculture of the 1960s & 70s
Laurel Canyon became a nexus of counterculture activity and attitudes in the mid-late 1960s and early 1970s, becoming famous as home to many of L.A.'s rock musicians, such as Cass Elliot of the Mamas & the Papas; Joni Mitchell; Frank Zappa; Jim Morrison of The Doors; Carole King; The Byrds; Buffalo Springfield; Canned Heat; John Mayall; members of the band The Eagles; the band Love; Neil Young; Brian Wilson of The Beach Boys as well as James Taylor, Jackson Browne, Ned Doheny, Bonnie Raitt, Linda Ronstadt, Harry Nilsson; and Micky Dolenz & Peter Tork of The Monkees. Cass Elliot's home was considered one of Laurel Canyon's biggest party houses with all-night, drug-fueled sleepovers, well attended by the hippest musicians and movie stars of the era.

John Phillips, also of the Mamas & the Papas, took inspiration from their home in Laurel Canyon for the song "Twelve Thirty (Young Girls Are Coming to the Canyon)", released in 1967. The following year, blues artist John Mayall recorded and released the album Blues from Laurel Canyon based on his experiences during a vacation that he spent in the Canyon.

The area and its denizens served as inspiration for Joni Mitchell's third album, Ladies of the Canyon, released in 1970. The house she lived in was immortalized in the Crosby, Stills, and Nash song, "Our House" (1970), written by her then-lover Graham Nash. The group is reputed to have met and first sung together in Mitchell's living room.

Legendary rock photographer Henry Diltz was also a resident and used the scenic Canyon backdrop for many of his historic photos of rock musicians casually socializing. Several of his photos became iconic representations of the 1960s and 1970s' West Coast music scene; others became famous album sleeve covers, such as CSN's debut album, Crosby, Stills & Nash (photographed in nearby West Hollywood).

Later years
Musician Josh Tillman has said that his output under the moniker Father John Misty was partly inspired by a relocation to and personal reinvention in Laurel Canyon. The song "I Went to the Store One Day", from his 2015 album I Love You, Honeybear, recounts the story of how Tillman met his wife, Emma, in the parking lot of the Laurel Canyon Country Store.

Wonderland murders
On July 1, 1981, three members and one associate of the Wonderland Gang, so-called because they were based at 8763 Wonderland Avenue, died in the Wonderland murders (also known as the "Four on the Floor murders" or the "Laurel Canyon murders"). Salon reports: "The massacre took place just down the street from what was then the home of Jerry Brown, who was California’s governor at the time.  The 8763 Wonderland Avenue address itself is said to have been inhabited at one time by Paul Revere and the Raiders."

See also
Counterculture of the 1960s
Echo in the Canyon
Laurel Canyon (film)
Lookout Mountain Air Force Station
The Mansion (recording studio)
Laurel Canyon (documentary)

References

Further reading
 Michael Walker, Laurel Canyon: The Inside Story of Rock 'n' Roll's Legendary Neighborhood, Farrar Straus and Giroux (May 16, 2006), hardcover, 277 pages,  trade paperback (May 1, 2007); .
 Barney Hoskyns, Hotel California: Singer-Songwriters and Cocaine Cowboys in the LA Canyons, 1967–1976, Harper Perennial (2006), Paperback, 316 pages, 
 Harvey Kubernik, Scott Calamar, Diltz, Henry, Lou Adler, Canyon of Dreams: The Magic and the Music of Laurel Canyon (Sterling Publishing, 2009), 384 pages, . Excerpts available at Google Books.
 David McGowan, Weird Scenes Inside the Canyon: Laurel Canyon, Covert Ops & the Dark Heart of the Hippie Dream, Headpress (18. April 2014), Paperback, 320 Pages,

External links
 www.laurelcanyon.org—website for the Laurel Canyon Association, which contains an extensive history edited by Rick Seireeni
 "Music and Mayhem in 'Laurel Canyon'", from NPR.org broadcast September 6, 2006

 
Neighborhoods in Los Angeles
Hollywood Hills
Populated places in the Santa Monica Mountains
Counterculture of the 1960s